Tamu District or Tuimu District  is an administrative district in Sagaing Division,  Burma (Myanmar).  Its administrative center is Tamu Town.

Townships
Tamu District consists of the following townships:
 Tamu Township
Sub-Township
 Khampat
 Myothit

References
Footnotes

Sources

Districts of Myanmar
Sagaing Region